The 2011 Moorilla Hobart International was a women's tennis tournament played on outdoor hard courts. It was the 18th edition of the event and was part of the WTA International tournaments of the 2011 WTA Tour. It took place at the Hobart International Tennis Centre in Hobart, Australia from 7 through 15 January 2011.

Entrants

Seeds

 as of 3 January 2011

Other entrants
The following players received wildcards into the singles main draw:
  Alicia Molik
  Sally Peers
  Olivia Rogowska

The following players received entry from the qualifying draw:
  Alberta Brianti
  Olga Govortsova
  Tamira Paszek
  Magdaléna Rybáriková

Champions

Singles

 Jarmila Groth defeated  Bethanie Mattek-Sands, 6–4, 6–3
 It was Groth's first title of the year and 2nd of her career.

Doubles

 Sara Errani /  Roberta Vinci defeated  Kateryna Bondarenko /  Līga Dekmeijere, 6–3, 7–5

References

Official website

 
Moorilla Hobart International
Moorilla Hobart International
Hobart International